The Palacio de los Deportes de Oviedo is a multi-purpose sports arena in Oviedo, Asturias, Spain. It has 3,713 seats and a maximum capacity of 6,000 and it is owned by the Oviedo City Hall.

History
The construction started in 1961 and was inaugurated in 1975. Its dome was the first one made entirely of ceramics without building any pillar. As it is green, and has the form of a turtle shell, it is commonly nicknamed as this animal. The indoor track has four lanes around the center and eight in the middle.

It was the main arena of the local rink hockey club CP Cibeles and the nowadays dissolved basketball teams CB Oviedo and CB Vetusta.

Events held at Palacio de Deportes

Since its inauguration, the Palacio de Deportes held several important championships.

1976 Roller Hockey World Cup
1981 CERH Cup Winners' Cup Finals: First leg match, CP Cibeles v Sporting CP
1983 1982–83 Liga Española de Baloncesto Finals: Final match, Barcelona v Real Madrid
1986 FIBA World Championship: Semifinal round, Group B
1987 CERH European Roller Hockey Championship
2008 Rink Hockey European Championship
2012 Davis Cup World Group: First round, Spain v Kazakhstan
2013 Copa del Rey de Hockey Patines

References

External links
Palacio de los Deportes at Oviedo Town Hall

Buildings and structures in Oviedo
Indoor arenas in Spain
Basketball venues in Spain
Sports venues in Asturias
Boxing venues in Spain